This is a list of lakes of Benin, located completely or partially within the country's borders.

Lakes
 Lake Ahémé
 Lake Aziri
 Lake Nokoué
 Lake Porto Novo
 Lake Sele
 Lake Toho
 Togbadji Lagoon

References

Benin
Lakes